Magnus Grävare (born 13 June 1961) is a sailor from Goteborg, Sweden, who represented his country at the 1984 Summer Olympics in Los Angeles, United States as helmsman in the Soling. With crew members Martin Grävare and Eric Wallin they took the 10th place.

References

Living people
1961 births
Sailors at the 1984 Summer Olympics – Soling
Olympic sailors of Sweden
Swedish male sailors (sport)
Tufts Jumbos sailors
Sportspeople from Gothenburg